Suraiya Jamal Sheikh (15 June 1929 – 31 January 2004), popularly known by the mononym Suraiya, was a popular actress and playback singer in India's Hindi-language films. She was active from 1936 to 1963, and was the most celebrated actress between the mid- to late 1940s, before she was surpassed in fame by Madhubala and Nargis.

In a career spanning from 1936 to 1963, Suraiya acted in 67 films and sang 338 songs. She was one of the greatest actresses of the Hindi cinema and a leading lady in Hindi language films in the 1940s and 1950s. She was also a renowned playback singer, who mostly sang for herself, starting from a song in Nai Duniya (1942) when she was only 12 years old.

She was known for her North Indian Muslim feudal style acting or adakari in many of her films. Suraiya made her first appearance as a child artist with the film Madame Fashion (1936), directed by Jaddan Bai. She made her acting debut with the film Taj Mahal in which she played the role of Mumtaz Mahal. In her heyday, she was known as Malika-e-Husn (queen of beauty), Malika-e-Tarannum (queen of melody) and Malika-e-Adakari (queen of acting).

Early life

Suraiya was born Suraiya Jamal Sheikh on 15 June 1929 in Lahore to Aziz Jamal Sheikh and Mumtaz Sheikh. She was one year old, when her family moved to Mumbai (then called Bombay) to reside at 'Krishna Mahal' at Marine Drive. Soon they were joined by her maternal uncle, M. Zahoor, who became a well known villain in the 1930s Bombay film industry. She attended New High School, now known as J.B. Petit High School for Girls, in the Fort district of Bombay. Suraiya's childhood friends included Raj Kapoor and Madan Mohan, with whom she used to sing in children's radio programmes at All India Radio.

Career

As an actress
Suraiya made her debut as a child actor in Jaddan Bai's Madame Fashion in 1936 as Miss Suraiya. Later, she got a prominent role with the help of her uncle, M. Zahoor. During a holiday from school in 1941, she accompanied him to Bombay's Mohan Studios to see the shooting of the film Taj Mahal, which was being directed by Nanubhai Vakil. Vakil noticed the charm and innocence of young Suraiya and selected her to play the role of Mumtaz Mahal.

While she was singing for children's programs for All India Radio (AIR) in Bombay, as a six-year old, Raj Kapoor and Madan Mohan were her co-artists. In fact, they first introduced her to AIR. Both were associated with her later as an adult, as her hero and as her music director respectively in films. At AIR, Zulfiqar Ali Bukhari was at that time the station director at the Bombay radio station. As soon as music director Naushad Ali heard Suraiya's voice, he chose her to sing (at age 13) for Mehtab in Abdul Rashid Kardar's film Sharda (1942). He became Suraiya's mentor and she sang some of the best songs of her career under his baton. Later, he gave hit after hit when Suraiya became a full-fledged singing star in Anmol Ghadi (1946), Dard (1947), Dillagi (1949) and Dastaan (1950).

As a child artist, she acted and also sang in Tamanna (1942), Station Master (1942), and Hamari Baat (1943). Devika Rani, who headed the Bombay Talkies production company, seeing her  blooming brilliance as an actress and as a singer signed her on a five-year contract at Rs. 500 per month with her role in Hamari Baat (1943). In the film she had a duet dance and her song with Arun Kumar, " Bistar Bicha Diya Hai Tere Ghar Ke Samne" became very popular.

This five-year contract was revoked by Devika Rani on Suraiya's request, when K. Asif offered Suraiya Rs. 40,000 for his film 'Phool'. As an adult, Suraiya initially played as Prithviraj's sister in K. Asif's Phool as Shama, with Prithviraj Kapoor as hero. At the age of 14 in 1943, Suraiya appeared as a heroine in J.K. Nanda's film Ishara, opposite Prithviraj Kapoor.

She played a heroine in the film Tadbir (1945) on the recommendation of K. L. Saigal, who liked her voice during a rehearsal of a song for Jayant Desai's film Samrat Chandragupt (1945) in which she was acting. He recommended her to Desai, opposite himself in Tadbir (1945). She went on to co-star with K. L. Saigal in Omar Khayyam (1946) and Parwana. Although by then she had a few hit songs, the four solo songs which she sang in Parwana for music director Khwaja Khurshid Anwar made her a genuine singer-film star. 

She acted as a co-star in Mehboob Khan's Anmol Ghadi (1946) with Noor Jehan as the lead actress and Surendra as the hero and in Dard (1947) with Munawwar Sultana as the lead actress and Nusrat as the hero. When Pyar Ki Jeet (1948) was released, with her as the heroine and Rehman as the lead actor, it caused large crowds outside Suraiya's house that had to be controlled by posting an inspector and four constables. Along with this, Suraiya also acted in the movie Gajre (1948). During the premiere of Badi Behen (1949), again with Rehman as her lead actor, there was a very large crowd outside the cinema hall and the police had to baton-charge when Suraiya was walking into the hall. People even pulled at her clothes, so that after that, Suraiya stopped going to the premieres of her films.

In the late 1940s, she worked with Dev Anand. While shooting the film Vidya (1948), she became romantically involved with him. The two of them were paired in seven films together; Vidya (1948), Jeet (1949), Shair (1949), Afsar (1950), Nili (1950), Do Sitare (1951) and Sanam (1951).

From the late 1940s to the early 1950s, Suraiya was the highest-paid and most popular star of the Indian cinema.

In Mirza Ghalib (1954), which won the 1954 National Award for Best Feature Film in India, Suraiya shone both as an actress and as a singer for her rendition of Ghalib's lover, 'Chaudvin'. Jawaharlal Nehru, commented on seeing the film, "Tumne Mirza Ghalib kii ruuh ko zindaa kar diyaa," ("You have brought the soul of Mirza Ghalib back to life").

After Mirza Ghalib, she acted in movies such as Bilwamangal (1954), Waris (1954), Shama Parwana (1954), Kanchan (1955), which was released in 1949 as Amar Kahani and re-released as Kanchan, Inam (1955), Mr. Lambu (1956), Trolly Driver (1958), Miss 1958 (1958), Maalik (1958) and Shama (1961). In the mid-fifties, Suraiya told Lata Mangeshkar once that she would soon be cutting down on her films. Lata told her not to do so. She also worked with then newcomer Shammi kapoor in Shama Parwana (1954). Rustam Sohrab (1963) was her last film. Suraiya in an interview said that during the shooting of the film, she suffered from low blood pressure, which was the reason for her giving up her acting career.

Her film Jaanwar in the early 1950s with Dilip Kumar as the leading star (and K. Asif as director), was left incomplete by her, as she refused to act in the film, because of rough behaviour by Dilip Kumar during the shooting of the film, when he tore her blouse and bruised her back so badly that it took a month to heal. Later, director-producer K. Asif wanted a kissing scene. Suraiya knew that censors would not pass it. When she asked Asif how he would get it through the censors, he could not satisfy her and she withdrew from the film. There was another story also, that Dilip Kumar and K. Asif were hand in glove to exploit and humiliate Suraiya, because Suraiya had earlier ignored Dilip Kumar's plea to act with her. So they did some torrid scene and kept on repeating it for four days. Fed up with this ghastly behaviour of the two, Suraiya refused to act for them and withdrew from the film. In 1953, she refused the film Anarkali as heroine, a role which went to Bina Rai.

Two other of her films were left incompleted, one of which was Pagalkhana (also, in early 50s), with Bharat Bhushan as lead actor, which was abandoned by the producer director P.L. Santoshi after eight reels, because of financial constraints. The other was an English version of Wajid Ali Shah, starring Suraiya and Ashok Kumar in 1953, being filmed by British film director Herbert Marshall, was shelved after being made for some time. A number of her films were announced with advertisements in film magazines, but were partially made or did not take off. These were Palken with Shekhar, to be produced and directed by Devendra Goel, for Goel Cine Corporation; Gumrah by Globe Pictures, Bombay; Nigah by CB Films; Sanwri by Kundi Art Productions, produced and directed by Niranjan and Ching Chow to be produced by Nigaristan (producers of Moti Mahal).

As a singer
Suraiya's first song as a child-singer was "Boot karun main polish babu" (as a playback singer) in the film Nai Duniya (1942), composed by Naushad. She went on to sing playback for actress Mehtab for Sharda (1942), Kanoon (1943) and Sanjog (1942–43) for Naushad and A.R. Kardar (director-producer), when her principal, Miss P.F. Puttack, took a strong view of her truancy from school, and her 'adventure' came to an abrupt halt. When Mehtab first saw baby Suraiya, she was hesitant to have her as her playback singer, but on hearing her, she wanted Suraiya to sing all her songs in her films.

Even in later years, in 1946, Mehtab was so attached to Suraiya's singing, that she requested Suraiya to record disc versions of her songs in her film Shama (1946), produced by Sohrab Modi, when Suraiya had become a busy heroine and had left singing playback in films for Mehtab. Suraiya then sang for Mehtab, in her own disc versions which were recorded by Shamshad Begum in the film.

Suraiya debuted with Manna Dey in his first Hindi film song, and their only duet 'Jago ayee usha' in Tamanna in 1942, was directed by his uncle, the famous K. C. Dey. Again in 1942, Suraiya paired with Rajkumari in Station Master ( with music director Naushad) for the  song 'Sajan ghar aye'. Suraiya acted in both these films.

In 1943, Suraiya sang a song "Ek Tu Hoo, Ek Main Hoon", music composed by Naushad, in the film Kanoon, which was the first song in Bombay music industry, which had characteristics of Latin American music.

The song "Bistar Bicha Liya Hai Tere Dar Ke Samne Ghar Hum Ne Le Liya hai Tere Ghar ke Samne", which Suraiya sang in duet with Arun Kumar for the film Hamari Baat (1943) was a major success.

A few years later, the singer-actor, K.L. Saigal was so impressed by the singing of the 16-year-old Suraiya, that he agreed to have her opposite him in the film Tadbir as a heroine and a singer in 1945. The music was directed by Lal Mohammad in the film. "Rani khol de dawar milne ka din aa gaya" is a memorable song from the film, she sang it with Saigal. Saigal again opted for Suraiya as his heroine and a singer in the films Omar Khayyam (1946) (with music director Lal Mohammad)  and Parwana (1947) (with music director Khurshid Anwar). Parwana was Saigal's last film and was released after his death.

Later, Suraiya continued to work with music director Naushad in a few films, and in 1946, she appeared with actress Noor Jehan in Anmol Ghadi as a co-star, with Naushad as the music director. She sang three songs in the film which became popular, of which 'Man leta hai angdai' went viral throughout the country. The musical film Dillagi (1949), under Kardar's direction, with Naushad's music, became a silver jubilee hit, with Suraiya becoming a national rage with her songs and acting. In a span of 22 years, she gave a number of hits. She sang about 51 songs for Naushad.

In her honey-rich voice, songs like "Woh paas rahein, ya door rahein", "Tere naino ne chori kiya", "Tu mera chaand, main teri chandni", "Yaad karun tori batiya" and the rare classical number "Man mor hua matwala" became an all-time favourite, along with "Nain dewane, ek nahin mane".

Khurshid Anwar was the music director in three films of Suraiya, viz. Ishara (1943), Parwana (1947) and Singaar (1949). Suraiya sang 13 songs in these films.

With the music director duo, Husnlal Bhagatram, Suraiya sang in 10 films and recorded the most songs (58, excluding 6 repeat songs for the film Kanchan) for any music director from 1948 to 1958. The films were Pyar Ji Jeet (1948), Aaj Ki Raat (1948), Naach (1949), Balam (1949), Bari Behen(1949), Amar Kahani(1949), Sanam (1951), Shama Parwana(1954), Kanchan (1955) and Trolley Driver (1955). Her song "O, door janewale, wada na bhul jana" in Pyar Ki Jeet in 1948 became a hit all over India.

Suraiya did only three films with music composer Sachin Dev Burman Vidya (1948) (with Dev Anand), Afsar (1949) (with Dev Anand) and Lal Kunwar (1952), as she was associated with other composers, and S.D. Burman came late into the scene in Bombay. Yet, most of their songs are memorable. "Man mor hua matwala" (in Afsar), "Nain Deewane", "Layi khushi ki dunia" (with Mukesh in 'Vidya') and "Preet sataye teri yaad na" in Lal Kunwar being some of them.

Ghulam Mohammad gave music for the National Award-winning film Mirza Ghalib (1954), in which she sang memorable songs of Mirza Ghalib. Kajal, Shair and Shama were other films for which he composed music for Suraiya.

Other directors who composed music for her in her film songs, include C. Ramchandra in the film Dewana, Roshan in the film Masuka, K. Dutta (in the films, Rang Mahal and Yateem), Krishen Dayal (in the film, Lekh for songs, such as, "Dil ka qarar lut gaya" and "Badra ki chaon tale"), S. Mohinder (in Nilli), Sardul Kwatra (in Goonj), Madan Mahan (in Khubsoorat), Roshan (in Mashuqa for songs, such as, "Mera bachpan wapas aya"), S.N.Tripahi (in Inaam), O.P. Nayyar (in Mr. Lamboo) and N. Dutta (in Miss 58). The music for her film, Main kya karoon (1945) was composed by Nino Mujamdar, for the film Shakti by Ram Prashad. Hansraj Behl composed music for the films Khilari (songs, such as, "Chahat ka bhulana mushkil hai" and Dil nashad na ro"), Shaan (songs, such as, "Tarap ae dil"), "Rajput", "Moti Mehal" and "Resham". Her music director in the film Shokian (songs, such as, "Ratoon ki neend chheen li") was Jamal Sen and Bilo C. Rani directed music in the film Bilwamangal (songs, such as, "Parwano se preet sekh le"), Shyam Sunder gave music for her films, Char Din and Kamal ke Phool. Sajjad Husain was her music director in two films, viz. 1857 and Rustom Sohrab.

Personal life

Suraiya had an affair with Dev Anand for four years from 1948 to 1951. Dev Anand nicknamed Suraiya "Nosey", while to Suraiya, Dev Anand was "Steve", a name chosen from a book Dev Anand had given her. Suraiya also called Anand "Devina" and he called her "Suraiyana", while faking an Italian accent. Suraiya was so much in love with Dev Anand that she let Lata sing some of the songs picturized on her in her films, in order to get more time to be with Dev Anand. Her love for Dev Anand was so intense that she was ready to forgo her singing star career for Dev, who was even more passionate about her.
At the height of their romance in the late forties, Suraiya  created a furore in film-world, when she and Dev Anand walked hand in hand at the dashing hero Shyam's marriage.
Kamini Kaushal, who worked with Suraiya and Dev Anand in Shair (1949), said in an interview to Filmfare in January 2014, that Suraiya would pass on her letters to her to be delivered to Dev Anand, when her grandmother started keeping an eye on their love-affair. She said that Dev Anand was non-aggressive, not someone to put his foot down and say, "I'll marry her".

During the shooting of director Rana Pratap's film Jeet (1949), both Dev Anand and Suraiya, with the help of the film cast and crew, namely Durga Khote (actress), Dwarka Divecha (cinematographer) and others, had made plans for marriage in a temple, and elopement, but at the last minute, an assistant director, jealous of their marriage, informed Suraiya's grandmother, who dragged her home from the scene. In the 'Star and Style' interview, Suraiya said that she gave in only when both her grandmother and her maternal uncle threatened to get Dev Anand killed. During the shooting of the film Neeli (1950), Dev Anand asked her final decision about their marriage, after their failed eloping incident. When Suraiya told Dev Anand that she did not want her to be the cause of his death, as both her grandmother and her maternal uncle opposed their marriage, he slapped her across the face and called her a "coward". Dev Anand later kept on apologising for days about his behaviour.

During the shooting of the film Afsar (1950), Dev Anand again formally proposed to her and gave her an engagement diamond ring worth rupees 3000. When her grandmother found about it, she was furious and threw the ring into the sea. After Suraiya's death in January 2004, Dev Anand revealed that Suraiya, who had gladly accepted his ring at first, never told him the reason for her later refusal of the marriage proposal, and that she was coerced to say "no" to him by her grandmother. However, in one of his subsequent interviews Dev Anand did say that Suraiya alluded to "my family, my religion".

Suraiya's maternal grandmother, Badshah Begum, who controlled the family, was fiercely opposed to Suraiya marrying Dev Anand. She was also supported by Suraiya's maternal uncle Zahoor and some film persons, viz. composer Naushad, director-producer A.R. Kardar, lyricist Naqshab (Nadira's first husband) and  director M. Sadiq. During the shooting of Dev Anand's own production Afsar (1950), Suraiya's grandmother started to oppose their romance openly and started interfering even in the shooting of their love scenes.
Her grandmother had opposed the relationship, mainly because they were Muslims and Dev Anand was a Hindu.
Although the principal reason for the opposition was religion, the covert one was that Suraiya was the only earning member of the family. Naqshab even brought a copy of the Koran to make her swear that she would not marry Dev Anand (February 1987, 'Star and Style' interview of both Dev Anand and Suraiya by Sheila Vesuna). The film people had also their own professional and personal interests in opposing an early marriage of their popular singing star. Suraiya's parents wanted her to marry Dev Anand, but being a mellow couple, their voice was ignored by the grandmother. Suraiya and Dev Anand were stopped from acting together after their last film in 1951 by her grandmother. Thereafter, Suraiya remained unmarried by her own choice for the rest of her life.

In an interview with 'Stardust', June 1972, Suraiya revealed that she lacked the courage to resist her family and that Dev Anand truly loved her. Dev Anand wanted her to be bold and marry him in a civil court. But Suraiya refused.
The painful experience with Dev Anand left her bruised emotionally, a phase from which many said she never recovered. She deliberately cut down her assignments after 1952. A retreat from the public atmosphere was followed by a return in films such as Mirza Ghalib (1954), for which she received praise even from the Prime Minister, Jawahar Lal Nehru, but she never attained the dizzy public popularity she had attained earlier on. Suraiya refused to marry anyone in future, in spite of efforts by her family to persuade her to marry certain film directors and businessmen of their community. Film director M. Sadiq, who was a married man, and actor Rehman were some of the film persons who were interested in marrying Suraiya.

Dev Anand, who was very depressed on her reluctant refusal to marry him, was counselled by his brother Chetan Anand to recover and stand up from the break up, and he went on to marry Kalpana Kartik two years later (1952 & 1953) in 1954 in a hurried simple marriage, but as he said in his auto-biography, Suraiya was his first true love. When Suraiya died in 2004, Dev Anand hid from the media in his terrace,  because he wanted to be away from the media. Suraiya's love for Dev Anand was equally intense in 1996, when she was cajoled to come to receive the Lifetime Achievement Award, saying that Dev Anand would be attending the show, but Dev Anand sought pardon to attend, confessing that he was not ready to face his lady love. Suraiya was hugely disappointed when Dev Anand did not turn up and was angry at the lady reporter who had lied to her.

Later life and last days
In 1963, Suraiya retired from acting career, supposedly due to two reasons. Her father Aziz Jamal Sheikh died that year, and because of her health problems.

Suraiya's maternal grandmother, Badshah Begum, who played a major part in her career and even her personal life, later went to Pakistan to live with her brother and his son, and she was left alone with her mother, Mumtaz Begum. The time with her mother were her happy years, when her mother took care of her daily needs and she would occasionally go to her film world friends. She had a few friends like old-timers Jairaj, Nimmi, Nirupa Roy and Tabassum, with whom she met occasionally. She briefly came into the limelight again in 1979 following publication of an interview with her by Raju Bhartan in The Illustrated Weekly of India, which she said caused several of her former colleagues in film world to get in contact with her.

After her mother's death in 1987, Suraiya became lonely in the apartment she rented from Aswin Shah in Krishna Mahal, Marine Drive in Mumbai, where she had lived from the early 1940s. She possessed several apartments in Worli, Mumbai and property in Lonavala, near Pune. She had lived alone for most of the time in her life.

In December 1998, Suraiya then over 68 years old, while in New Delhi to receive the Sahitya Academy Award during Mirza Ghalib's bi-centenary celebrations, talked in a low voice and declined to sing, saying she had left “mosiqui (music) years ago”. When a reporter mentioned Dev Anand, she avoided the comment, and chose to change the subject by saying that it was getting late and she had to go back.

Tabassum, who worked with Suraiya in Bari Behen and Moti Mahal as her younger sister, met her often at her home, or rang Suraiya from home. During Suraiya's last few months, Tabassum said "It's sad that she had shut her doors to the world in her last days. Sometimes when I visited her, I'd find papers and milk collected at her door. She never opened the door. But she'd talk comfortably with me on the phone. I remember our last conversation. I asked her: "Aapa kaisi hain?" (Elder sister, how are you?") She replied in verse: "Kaisi guzar rahi hai sabhi poochte hai mujhse, kaise guzaarti hoon koi nahin poochta."( "Everybody asks me 'how are you', but nobody asks me how I spend my days and nights.") (As told to Farhana Farook in 2012).

She died at Mumbai's Harkishandas Hospital on 31 January 2004 aged 75, after being admitted there a week previously suffering from various ailments, including hypoglycemia, ischaemia and insulinoma. She had not long since been discharged after a previous hospitalisation. Among her visitors were Sunil Dutt, Naushad and Pratap A. Rana.  Actor Dharmendra, who was her ardent fan, attended her funeral. She was buried at Badakabarastan in Marine Lines, Mumbai.

For the last thirty years of her life, she had a family friend and guide in her lawyer, Dhimant Thakkar and his family, with whom she had very close family relations. During the last six months of her life, Suraiya lived with the Thakkar family, who admitted her to hospital when she was ill.

After her death, Suraiya's property at Worli and her house at Marine Drive went into legal dispute, as she did not leave behind an explicit will. While the house at Marine Drive was claimed by Thakkar, her lawyer since 1975, and her Pakistani cousin, Mehfooz Ahmed (maternal uncle M. Zahoor's son) in Dubai, her property was claimed by the adopted family of her lawyer (based on his daughter being a nominee in Suraiya's papers and gift to her as 'hiba'), and her cousin. No relatives from her father's side claimed anything from her property. In 2006, Mumbai High Court granted Mehfooz Ahmed the right to administer the estate. In 2008, her maternal cousin brother (Mehfooz Ahmed), who never met her for over 40 years before her death, got the right to the rented house at Krishna Mahal, valued at 7.5 crores rupees, as a tenant by the High Court judgement (according to Mumbai's old rent control laws) over her family lawyer. The house owner Ashwin Shah did not contest the case. The cousin had no objection to the house being sold.

Honours and recognition

In 1946, Suraiya's film Anmol Ghadi with Noor Jehan and Surendra celebrated 'Silver Jubilee' (25 weeks continuous run in one or more cinema halls) in Bombay (now 'Mumbai') and other cities of India.

In 1951, the inaugural issue of the film news-weekly Screen featured a photograph of Suraiya on its cover.

In 1954, her film Mirza Ghalib was awarded the President's gold medal for the Best Feature Film of 1954 during the 2nd National Film Awards, with the then Prime Minister, Jawaharlal Nehru, remarking at the ceremony that she had brought Mirza Ghalib to life ('Tumne Mirza Ghalib ki rooh ko zindaa kar diyaa'). Suraiya thought his praise more worthy than an Oscar.

In November 1956, Suraiya was sent as a part of delegate, consisting of Raj Kapoor, Nargis, Kamini Kaushal to the Soviet Union by the Government of India, where her films were screened.
 
In 1996, Suraiya was awarded the Screen Lifetime Achievement Award.

In December 1998, she was specially honoured for perpetuating Mirza Ghalib's memory by her acting and songs by the then Prime Minister, Atal Behari Vajpayee during the Mirza Ghalib bi-centenary celebrations in New Delhi.

On 30 April 2003, Suraiya was honoured and awarded a memento by the Dadasaheb Phalke Academy and Screen World Publication at a special function on the 134th birth anniversary of Dada Phalke.

On 3 May 2013, a postage stamp, bearing her image in various roles, was released by the India Post owned by the Government of India to honour her on the occasion of the '100 Years of Indian Cinema'.

In 2013, Suraiya was voted as the 'Best On Screen Beauty with the Most Ethnic Look', during the  celebrations on the completion of 100 years of the Indian cinema.

Tributes
O. P. Dutta, director-writer, the only living director (when she died) to have worked with her (in Pyar Ki Jeet) remembered her: "Suraiya, Bano to me, was a bundle of unforgettable qualities. A sublime voice, the ring in the voice, the perfect diction, the effortless rendering. But she always insisted that she was no singer... There were congratulations all around (on her success in his film). But Suraiya insisted she was no great shakes as an actress. The argument was over when she gave a sterling performance in Bari Behen. The success made Suraiya smile that unforgettable smile that could send a thousand hearts aflutter. She was right at the top and I was very happy for her."

Dilip Kumar said on her death that "She was a caring girl, very affectionate, particularly with junior artistes... Suraiya will be sorely missed, even though she had been a recluse for decades."

Dev Anand said "I did not go to her funeral because I would have been reminded of her past. I cried from a distance."

Outlook (magazine) wrote after her death: "She evoked the kind of hysteria [in the late 1940s] that can be compared only with Rajesh Khanna in his heyday from 1969 to 1972. Ask any old-timer and they would confirm that people bunked offices, schools and colleges, even shops closed on the opening day of her films, to see her films first day, first show."

The Hindu newspaper wrote about Suraiya: "What can you say about a lady, who was courted by Dev Anand, respected by Pandit Jawaharlal Nehru, but feared by Lata Mangeshkar! That she was beautiful, talented, adored by millions, but died a lonely single woman? Or, that she was the best ever superstar singer-actress of Indian films, yet walked away to a self-imposed exile at the height of her glory? Yes, Suraiya was all this, plus 'a riddle, wrapped in a mystery, inside an enigma' who resolutely shunned screen and media once she departed from the arc lights."

Suraiya's songs, as a tribute to her, are played every year on her birth anniversary, 15 June and her death anniversary on 31 January by Radio Ceylon.

Filmography

References

External links

 Suraiya Songs
 
 
 
 Legends – Suraiya: Her profile, Interview, complete list of her songs and reviews of her films
 "Suraiya: the reluctant goddess" The Indian Express.

1929 births
2004 deaths
20th-century Indian actresses
Indian women playback singers
Indian film actresses
Actresses in Hindi cinema
20th-century Indian singers
People from Gujranwala
Singers from Mumbai
Indian women ghazal singers
Indian ghazal singers
Punjabi people
20th-century Indian women singers
Actresses from Punjab, India
Women musicians from Punjab, India
Singers from Punjab, India